A proof text is a passage of scripture presented as proof for a theological doctrine, belief, or principle. Prooftexting (sometimes "proof-texting" or "proof texting") is the practice of using quotations from a document, either for the purpose of exegesis, or to establish a proposition in eisegesis  (introducing one's own presuppositions, agendas, or biases). Such quotes may not accurately reflect the original intent of the author, and a document quoted in such a manner, when read as a whole, may not support the proposition for which it was cited. The term has currency primarily in theological and exegetical circles.

This is to be distinguished from quotations from a source deemed a hostile witness, which inadvertently substantiate a point beneficial to the quoter in the course of its own narrative. Even when lifted out of context, those facts still stand.

See also
 Quote mining

References

Communication
Christian terminology